Health & Social Care in the Community is a bimonthly peer-reviewed academic journal covering all aspects community health, health care, and social work. It was established in 1993 and is published by John Wiley & Sons. The editor-in-chief is Helen Skouteris (Monash University). According to the Journal Citation Reports, the journal has a 2020 impact factor of 2.821, ranking it 7th out of 44 journals in the category "Social Work".

References

External links

Public health journals
Social work journals
Wiley (publisher) academic journals
Bimonthly journals
English-language journals
Publications established in 1993